Dattatraya may refer to:

Dattatraya Damodar Dabke, actor in the first ever Indian full length silent film Raja Harishchandra
Bandaru Dattatraya, (born 1947), Indian politician, Governor of the State of Haryana
Madhukar Dattatraya Deoras (1915–1996), the third Sarsanghchalak of the Rashtriya Swayamsevak Sangh
Dattatraya Ekbote (1936–2020), Indian workers' rights activist, politician and former Mayor of Pune
Dattatraya Ganesh Godse (1914–1992), Indian historian, playwright, art critic, art director, illustrator
Shankar Dattatraya Javdekar (1894–1955), Marathi writer from Maharashtra, India
Dattatraya Shridhar Joshi (born 1908), Indian Civil Servant of 1933 batch
Sanjay Dattatraya Kakade (born 1967), Member of Parliament representing Maharashtra in the Rajya Sabha
Dattatraya Bhikaji Kulkarni (1934–2016), Marathi writer, critic, retired university professor
Sameer Dattatraya Meghe (born 1978), member of the 13th Maharashtra Legislative Assembly
Dattatraya Naik (1890–1968), Indian cricket umpire
Dattatraya Yeshwant Phadke, head of Electronics division at Tata Institute of Fundamental Research
Dattatraya Rane, leader of Bharatiya Janata Party
Dattatraya C. Patil Revoor, Indian politician, president of Kalyana-Karnataka Region Development Board
Rajaram Dattatraya Thakur (1923–1975), Indian film director in the Marathi film industry

See also
Dattatreya